Acanthocercus yemensis is a species of lizard in the family Agamidae. It is a small lizard found in Yemen and Saudi Arabia.

References

Acanthocercus
Reptiles described in 1954
Taxa named by Wolfgang Klausewitz